The 2001–02 Texas Tech Red Raiders men's basketball team represented Texas Tech University in the Big 12 Conference during the 2001–02 NCAA Division I men's basketball season. The head coach was Bob Knight, his first year with the team. Knight replaced James Dickey, who was fired after four consecutive losing seasons while Texas Tech was under NCAA probation. The Red Raiders played their home games in the United Spirit Arena in Lubbock, Texas.

Roster

Schedule and results

|-
!colspan=9 style=| Regular Season

|-
!colspan=9 style=| Big 12 Tournament

|-
!colspan=9 style=| NCAA Tournament

Rankings

References

Texas Tech Red Raiders basketball seasons
Texas Tech
Texas Tech
Texas Tech
Texas Tech